A Nallathambi is an Indian politician and a member of the Dravida Munnetra Kazhagam party. He was elected as a member of Tamil Nadu Legislative Assembly from Tiruppattur, Vellore Assembly constituency in May 2021.

Early life 
His father name is A. Annadurai and his educational qualification is 10th standard pass. As of May 2021 he is 45 years old.

Member of Legislative Assembly
He represents the Tiruppattur, Vellore Assembly constituency as Member of Legislative Assembly (MLA) in Tamil Nadu Legislative Assembly.

Committee assignments of 16th Tamil Nadu Assembly
Member (2021-23) Committee on Privileges

Electoral performance

References 

1970s births
Living people
Year of birth uncertain
People from Tamil Nadu
Tamil Nadu politicians
Dravida Munnetra Kazhagam politicians
Tamil Nadu MLAs 2016–2021
Tamil Nadu MLAs 2021–2026
People from Vellore district